Haramosh Peak (also known as Haramosh or Peak 58) is a mountain located in the Karakoram range of the Gilgit-Baltistan of Pakistan. The Total population of haramosh Vellay at least 8000 people.according to researchers. Its height is also often given as 7,409m.
It rises steeply above the north bank of the Indus River, a little ways upstream of its confluence with the Gilgit River. The massif has two summits, Haramosh Peak and Haramosh Kutwal Laila Peak. The peak was first scaled in 1958 by an Austrian team consisting of Heini Roiss, Stephan Pauer, and Dr. Franz Mandl.


Climbing history
Haramosh was first reconnoitered in 1947 by a Swiss team, and a German team investigated a northeastern route in 1955. In 1957, Tony Streather, John Emery, Bernard Jillot and Rae Culbert, a team from Oxford University experienced repeated falls and misfortunes during a failed attempt, leading to the deaths of Jillot and Culbert. Streather and Emery survived.  The latter suffered severe frostbite and lost all of his fingers and toes.
The epic tale of this expedition is told in Ralph Barker's The Last Blue Mountain.

Haramosh was first climbed on 4 August 1958 by three Austrian mountaineers, Heinrich Roiss, Stefan Pauer and Franz Mandl, via the Haramosh La (a saddle to the northeast) and the East Ridge, roughly the route of the 1957 tragedy.

According to the Himalayan Index, there have been only three more ascents, in 1978 (Japanese, West Ridge), 1979 (unknown party/route), and 1988 (Polish, Southwest Face).

References

Sources

External links
 Picture of the Haramosh south face
 A world peak list ranked by local relief and steepness (Reduced Spire Measure) features Haramosh as the world #17.

Seven-thousanders of the Karakoram
Mountains of Gilgit-Baltistan